Cnemotettix bifasciatus is a species of wetas & king crickets in the family Anostostomatidae. It is found in North America.

References

Anostostomatidae
Articles created by Qbugbot
Insects described in 1973